The 2012 Aberdeen City Council election took place on 3 May 2012 to elect members of Aberdeen City Council. The election used the 13 wards created as a result of the Local Governance (Scotland) Act 2004, with each ward electing three or four Councillors using the single transferable vote system a form of proportional representation, with 43 Councillors elected.

Local political activist Renee Slater caused great controversy when she registered a mannequin doll as 'Helena Torry' in the Hazlehead/Ashley/Queens Cross ward. This was withdrawn soon after being spotted and a report has been issued to Grampian Police.

The election saw the Scottish Liberal Democrats decimated as they lost two-thirds of their Councillors. The Scottish National Party secured 3 gains copper-fastening their by-election gains during the 2007–2012 term. However, it was Labour who proved to be the biggest winners with 7 gains and 17 total seats as they secured first place. Independents gained 2 seats while the Tories lost 2 seats.

On 9 May an agreement was reached to form a coalition.  The coalition was formed between the Scottish Labour Party, the Scottish Conservative and Unionist Party and three Independent councillors. Labour had 17 seats, the Tories contributed three and there were three independent members.

Election results 

Note: The net gain/loss and percentage changes relate to the result of the previous Scottish local elections on 3 May 2007. This may differ from other published sources showing gain/loss relative to seats held at dissolution of Scotland's councils.

Ward results

Dyce/Bucksburn/Danestone
2007: 2xLib Dem; 1xLab; 1xSNP
2012: 2xSNP; 2xLab
2007-2012 Change: SNP and Lab gain one seat from Lib Dem

Bridge of Don
2007: 2xLib Dem; 1xSNP; 1xLab
2012: 2xSNP; 1xIndependent; 1xLab
2007-2012 Change: SNP and Independent gain one seat from Lib Dem

Kingswells/Sheddocksley
2007: 1xSNP; 1xLib Dem; 1xLab
2012: 1xSNP; 1xLib Dem; 1xLab
2007-2012: No change

Northfield
2007: 2xSNP; 1xLab
2012: 2xLab; 1xSNP
2007-2012 Change: Lab gain one seat from SNP

Hilton/Stockethill
2007: 1xSNP; 1xLab; 1xLib Dem
2012: 2xLab; 1xSNP
2007-2012 Change: Lab gain one seat from Lib Dem

Tillydrone/Seaton/Old Aberdeen
2007: 1xSNP; 1xLab; 1xLib Dem
2012: 2xLab; 1xSNP
2007-2012 Change: Lab gain one seat from Lib Dem

Midstocket/Rosemount
2007: 1xCon; 1xSNP; 1xLab; 
2012: 1xLab; 1xSNP; 1xCon
2007-2012 Change: No change = Cons regain seat lost in by-election Aug 2007

George Street/Harbour
2007: 1xSNP; 1xLab; 1xLib Dem
2012: 2xLab; 1xSNP
2007-2012 Change: Lab gain one seat from Lib Dem

Lower Deeside
2007: 1xLib Dem; 1xCon; 1xIndependent
2012: 1xIndependent; 1xLib Dem; 1xLab
2007-2012 Change: Lab gain one seat from Con

Hazlehead/Ashley/Queens Cross
2007: 2xLib Dem; 1xCon; 1xSNP
2012: 2xLib Dem; 1xCon; 1xSNP
2007-2012 Change: No change

 = Outgoing Councillor from a different Ward.

Airyhall/Broomhill/Garthdee
2007: 2xLib Dem; 1xCon
2012: 1xLib Dem; 1xLab; 1xSNP
2007-2012 Change: SNP and Lab gain one seat from Lib Dem and Con

Torry/Ferryhill
2007: 1xSNP; 1xLab; 1xLib Dem; 1xCon
2012: 2xSNP; 1xLab; 1xCon
2007-2012 Change: SNP gain one seat from Lib Dem

 = Outgoing Councillor from a different Ward.

Kincorth/Loirston
2007: 1xSNP; 1xLib Dem; 1xLab
2012: 1xSNP; 1xLab; 1xIndependent
2007-2012 Change: Independent gain one seat from Lib Dem

References

https://web.archive.org/web/20120508053322/http://www.aberdeencity.gov.uk/council_government/councillors/elections_unit/election_results_2012.asp

Post-Election Changes
† In January 2014, Torry/Ferryhill Cllr Alan Donnelly was expelled from the Conservative Party group and sits as an Independent.
†† In May 2014, Midstocket/Rosemount Cllr Jenny Laing replaced Dyce/Bucksburn/Danestone Cllr Barney Crockett as leader of the council.
††† In May 2014, Midstocket/Rosemount Cllr Fraser Forsyth resigned from the Conservative Party group and sat as an Independent  He announced his future resignation on 24 June 2015 as he would be moving with his family to York and formally resigned his seat on 30 July 2015. A by-election was held on 1 October 2015 and the by-election was won by the SNP's Alex Nicoll.
†††† On 11 May 2015, Kincorth/Loirston SNP Cllr Callum McCaig resigned his seat on the council to concentrate on his duties as MP for Aberdeen South.  A by-election was held on 30 July 2015 and it was won by the SNP's Stephen Flynn.
†††††On 11 May 2015, Hilton/Stockethill SNP Cllr Kirsty Blackman resigned her seat on the council to concentrate on her duties as MP for Aberdeen North.  A by-election was held on 30 July 2015 and it was won by the SNP's Neil Copeland.
†††††† On 28 May 2015, George Street/Harbour SNP Cllr Andrew May announced he would resign his seat on the council in July 2015.  A by-election was held on 1 October 2015 and the seat was held by the SNP's Michael Hutchison.

By-election since 2012

2012
2012 Scottish local elections
21st century in Aberdeen